Sejkov is a village and municipality in the Sobrance District in the Košice Region of east Slovakia.

History
In historical records the village was first mentioned in 1412.

Geography
The village lies at an altitude of 116 metres and covers an area of 7.026 km².
It has a population of 203 people.

Facilities
The village has a public library and a soccer pitch.

External links
 
http://en.e-obce.sk/obec/sejkov/sejkov.html
http://www.statistics.sk/mosmis/eng/run.html 

Villages and municipalities in Sobrance District